Anneessens premetro station is a premetro (underground tram) station in central Brussels, Belgium, located under the Place Anneessens/Anneessensplein, along the /. It is part of the North–South Axis, a tram tunnel crossing the city centre between Brussels-North railway station and Albert premetro station. Tram routes 3 and 4, as well as evening routes 31, 32 and 33 stop at this station.

External links
 STIB/MIVB official website

Brussels metro stations
City of Brussels